Zalaqi-ye Gharbi Rural District is a rural district (dehestan) in Besharat District, Aligudarz County, Lorestan Province, Iran. At the 2006 census, its population was 3,252, in 524 families.  The rural district has 41 villages.

References 

Rural Districts of Lorestan Province
Aligudarz County